NOVOAIR is an airline based in Dhaka, Bangladesh operating mostly domestic flights. It operates 25 flights each day from Dhaka to its seven destinations.

History
NOVOAIR was established in October 2007 as an aviation service provider as the business diversification of parent company Tusuka Group with directors Arshad Jamal, Faiz Khan, Mofizur Rahman, and Fayzur Rahman Badal. The process of establishing a scheduled airline began in late 2011. NOVOAIR launched a commercial operation on 9 Jan 2013 with Embraer 145 jet aircraft. Later the Embraer fleet was replaced with ATR 72-500 turboprop aircraft. The airline currently operates to all domestic destinations of the country, with the lone international destination of Kolkata.

In July 2013, NOVOAIR launched Smiles, the frequent-flyer program of the airline. Smiles is the first frequent-flyer program for domestic flights in Bangladesh's aviation history. Tiered benefits include special offers, travel packages, waiting list priority, priority services (sales counter, check-in and boarding) and excess baggage allowance.

NOVOAIR received the Monitors best domestic airlines award in 2014.

NOVOAIR launched international flights on 1 December 2015. The airline is consolidating its domestic network and eyeing

for expansion in international sectors.

In December 2020, the airline expressed its plan to add three more small-sized aircraft and three mid-sized Airbus A320 by 2022 to extend its international operations to Singapore, Doha, Muscat, Kuala Lumpur alongside Bagdogra, Chennai and Guwahati of India. But due to COVID-19 pandemic the plan has been postponed.

Services
As of its seventh anniversary on 9 January 2020, the airline had operated 61,599 flights to domestic destinations and its only international destination, Kolkata, carrying more than 3.33 million passengers.

Destinations
As of 2018, Novoair serves the following destinations:

Fleet
 the Novoair fleet consists of the following aircraft.

Novoair was the first and so far the only Bangladeshi airline to use Embraer ERJ 145. However, they later focused on an all-ATR fleet. On 15 December 2019, the airline added its seventh aircraft.

Incidents 
Novoair aircraft (VQ-967) has suffered a tire burst while landing at Saidpur Airport on Nov 17, 2021. The plane that carried 70 passengers was made to stop on the runway, and no casualties were reported.

On Nov 17, 2019, the Novoair flight's tire burst while landing at Shah Makhdum Airport in Rajshahi. There were 33 passengers on board at the time, but no injuries were reported.

See also
 List of airlines of Bangladesh
 Transport in Bangladesh

References

External links

Official website

Airlines of Bangladesh
Airlines established in 2013
Bangladeshi companies established in 2013